Mineola Independent School District is a public school district based in Mineola, Texas (USA).

In 2009, the school district was rated academically acceptable by the Texas Education Agency.

See also
List of school districts in Texas

References

External links
Mineola ISD
High School

School districts in Wood County, Texas